There were over 140 entries in the Romford Garden Suburb exhibition, that took place in 1911 in Gidea Park, Romford, now in the London Borough of Havering. Each house had its own designer, who were either of national or local acclaim, with, on occasion, several dwellings being designed by a single architect.  The object of the new suburb, which was built on land belonging to Gidea Hall, then occupied by the Liberal Member of parliament, Herbert Raphael, was, according to his liberal parliamentary colleague John Burns, to "provide families with a well-built, modern home regardless of class or status" and "to bring the towns into the country and the country into the towns".

One hundred architects and urban planners took part in the Romford development, including William Curtis Green, Philip Tilden, Raymond Unwin, Richard Barry Parker, and Baillie Scott. The exhibition opened in the Spring of 1911, and with it came the establishment of several roads, including Balgores Lane, Crossways, Heath Drive, Heaton Grange Road, Meadway, Parkway, Reed Pond Walk, Risebridge Road, and Squirrels Heath Avenue. Of the 140 houses built in 1911, six were designated as Grade II listed buildings by Historic England.

Entries

Note: The source for this list is The Book of the Exhibition of Houses and Cottages, Romford Garden Suburb, Gidea Park, pp. 61–144.

References

Housing in England
Garden suburbs
Arts and Crafts architecture in London
London Borough of Havering
Grade II listed buildings in London